In historical linguistics, vowel breaking, vowel fracture, or diphthongization is the sound change of a monophthong into a diphthong or triphthong.

Types
Vowel breaking may be unconditioned or conditioned. It may be triggered by the presence of another sound, by stress, or in no particular way.

Assimilation
Vowel breaking is sometimes defined as a subtype of diphthongization, when it refers to harmonic (assimilatory) process that involves diphthongization triggered by a following vowel or consonant.

The original pure vowel typically breaks into two segments. The first segment matches the original vowel, and the second segment is harmonic with the nature of the triggering vowel or consonant. For example, the second segment may be  (a back vowel) if the following vowel or consonant is back (such as velar or pharyngeal), and the second segment may be  (a front vowel) if the following vowel or consonant is front (such as palatal).

Thus, vowel breaking, in the restricted sense, can be viewed as an example of assimilation of a vowel to a following vowel or consonant.

Unconditioned
Vowel breaking is sometimes not assimilatory and is then not triggered by a neighboring sound.

Stress
Vowel breaking sometimes occurs only in stressed syllables. For instance, Vulgar Latin open-mid  and  changed to diphthongs only when they were stressed.

Examples

English
Vowel breaking is a very common sound change in the history of the English language, occurring at least three times (with some varieties adding a fourth) listed here in reverse chronological order:

Southern American English

Vowel breaking is characteristic of the "Southern drawl" of Southern American English, where the short front vowels have developed a glide up to [j], and then in some areas back down to schwa: pat , pet , pit .

Great Vowel Shift
The Great Vowel Shift changed the long vowels  to diphthongs, which became Modern English .
 Old English  > Modern English ice 
 Old English  > Modern English house

Middle English 

In early Middle English, a vowel  was inserted between a front vowel and a following  (pronounced  in this context), and a vowel  was inserted between a back vowel and a following  (pronounced  in this context).

That is a prototypical example of the narrow sense of "vowel breaking" as described above: the original vowel breaks into a diphthong that assimilates to the following consonant, gaining a front  before a palatal consonant and  before a velar consonant.

Old English 

In Old English, two forms of harmonic vowel breaking occurred: breaking and retraction and back mutation.

In prehistoric Old English, breaking and retraction changed stressed short and long front vowels i, e, æ to short and long diphthongs spelled io, eo, ea when followed by h or by r, l + another consonant (short vowels only), and sometimes w (only for certain short vowels):
 Proto-Germanic  > Anglo-Frisian  > Old English feallan "fall"
 PG  > OE eorþe "earth"
 PG  > OE liornan "learn"

In late prehistoric Old English, back mutation changed short front i, e, æ to short diphthongs spelled io, eo, ea before a back vowel in the next syllable if the intervening consonant was of a certain nature. The specific nature of the consonants that trigger back umlaut or block it varied from dialect to dialect.

Old Norse 

Proto-Germanic stressed short e becomes ja or (before u) jǫ regularly in Old Norse except after w, r, l. Examples are:
 PG *ek(a) "I" → (east) ON jak, Swedish jag, Danish and Norwegian Bokmål jeg, and Icelandic ek → ég (but Jutlandic æ, a, Nynorsk ).
 Faroese has both.
 PG *hertōn "heart" → ON hjarta, Swedish hjärta, Faroese hjarta, Norwegian Nynorsk hjarta, Danish hjerte
 PG *erþō "earth" → Proto-Norse *erþū → ON jǫrð, Swedish, Danish, Norwegian jord, Faroese jørð

According to some scholars, the diphthongisation of e is an unconditioned sound change, whereas other scholars speak about epenthesis or umlaut.

German and Yiddish 
The long high vowels of Middle High German underwent breaking during the transition to Early New High German:  → . In Yiddish, the diphthongization affected the long mid vowels as well:  → 
 MHG  → NHG ,  ("eternal")
 MHG  → NHG ,  ("high")
 MHG  → NHG ,  ("nice")
 MHG  → NHG ,  ("to cut")
 MHG  → NHG ,  ("friend")
 MHG  → NHG ,  ("skin")

This change started as early as the 12th century in Upper Bavarian and reached Moselle Franconian only in the 16th century. It did not affect Alemannic or Ripuarian dialects, which still retain the original long vowels.

  →  ("Pesach")
  →  ("menorah")
 Old Czech: chřěn →  ("chrain")
  →  ("basket")

Scottish Gaelic 
Vowel breaking is present in Scottish Gaelic with the following changes occurring often but variably between dialects: Archaic Irish eː →  Scottish Gaelic iə and Archaic Irish oː →  Scottish Gaelic uə  Specifically, central dialects have more vowel breaking than others.

Romance languages
Many Romance languages underwent vowel breaking. The Vulgar Latin open vowels e  and o  in stressed position underwent breaking only in open syllables in French and Italian, but in both open and closed syllables in Spanish. The middle vowel was subsequently lost if a triphthong was produced: Modern Catalan cuixa, vuit, llit (cf. Portuguese coxa, oito, leito). Vowel breaking was completely absent in Portuguese. The result of breaking varies between languages: e and o became ie and ue in Spanish, ie and uo in Italian and ie and eu  in French.

In the table below, words with breaking are bolded.

Romanian

 Latin pellis > Romanian piele "skin"

It underwent a later breaking of stressed e and o to ea and oa before a mid or open vowel:
 Latin porta > Romanian poartă "gate"
 Latin flōs (stem flōr-) > Romanian floare "flower"

Sometimes a word underwent both forms of breaking in succession:
 Latin petra > Early Romanian pietră > Romanian piatră "stone" (where ia results from hypothetical *iea)

The diphthongs that resulted from the Romance and the Romanian breakings were modified when they occurred after palatalized consonants.

Quebec French

In Quebec French, long vowels are generally diphthongized in the last syllable.

 tard  → 
 père  → 
 fleur  → 
 fort  → 
 autre  → 
 neutre  → 
 pince  → 
 onze  →

Proto-Indo-European 
Some scholars believe that Proto-Indo-European (PIE) i, u had vowel-breaking before an original laryngeal in Greek, Armenian and Tocharian but that the other Indo-European languages kept the monophthongs:

 PIE * → * "alive" → Gk. , Toch. B śāw-, śāy- (but Skt. jīvá-, Lat. vīvus)
 PIE * → * "front side" → Gk.  "face", Toch. B pratsāko "breast" (but Skt. prátīka-)
 PIE * → * "long" → Gk. , Arm. *twār → erkar (Skt. dūrá-, Lat. dūrus).

However, the hypothesis has not been widely adopted.

See also
Smoothing (phonetics)
Unpacking (linguistics)

References

Bibliography 
Crowley, Terry. (1997) An Introduction to Historical Linguistics. 3rd edition. Oxford University Press.

Vowel shifts